Ivanovka 1-ya is a rural locality (a settlement) and the administrative center of Ivanovskoye Rural Settlement, Paninsky District, Voronezh Oblast, Russia. The population was 301 as of 2010. There are 3 streets.

Geography 
Ivanovka 1-ya is located on the Pravaya Khava River, 14 km west of Panino (the district's administrative centre) by road. Krasnye Kholmy is the nearest rural locality.

References 

Rural localities in Paninsky District